Pacific Hills School (previously named Bel Air Prep) was a co-educational independent school located in West Hollywood, California, serving the needs of a diverse student population in grades 6-12.  The school had a diverse international student population with about 20% of the school's students hailing from eleven countries on six continents.

On average each year had about 85 students enrolled at Pacific Hills School with an average class size of 13.

Pacific Hills offered 12 AP courses, advanced programs in music, the arts and sciences.

In 2018 the school closed permanently.

Notable alumni
Jason Bateman - Actor
Monica Lewinsky - graduated salutatorian
Dasha Zhukova - Russian-American businesswoman
 Khloé Kardashian – attended but did not graduate

References

External links

 Pacific Hills School

Private middle schools in California
Buildings and structures in West Hollywood, California
Private high schools in California
Preparatory schools in California